is a junction passenger railway station located in the city of Tokorozawa, Saitama, Japan, operated by the private railway operator Seibu Railway. It is located in front of the Seibu Dome, the home field of the Saitama Seibu Lions baseball team owned by Seibu Railway.

Lines
Some through services operate to and from  via the Seibu Ikebukuro Line.

Station layout

The station consists of a three ground-level terminating platforms serving six tracks for the Sayama Line, and two more platforms for the Yamaguchi Line. Platforms 3 to 6 are normally used only for additional services.

Platforms

History
It was renamed Seibukyūjō-mae on 25 March 1979, following the opening of the Seibu baseball stadium nearby.

Station numbering was introduced on all Seibu Railway lines during fiscal 2012, with this station becoming "SI41" on the Seibu Sayama Line and "SY03" on the Seibu Yamaguchi Line.

Passenger statistics
In fiscal 2019, the station was the 62nd busiest on the Seibu network with an average of 13,830 passengers daily.  The passenger figures for previous years are as shown below.

The passenger figures for the station in previous years are as shown below.

Surrounding area

 Seibu Dome
 Sayama Ski Slope
 Murayama Reservoir

References

External links

 Seibukyūjō-mae Station information (Seibu) 

Railway stations in Saitama Prefecture
Railway stations in Japan opened in 1929
Railway stations in Tokorozawa, Saitama
Stations of Seibu Railway
Seibu Sayama Line